Gary Benson may refer to:

 Gary Benson (poker player) (born 1957), poker player and sports bettor
 Gary Benson (musician), English singer-songwriter
 Gary Benson, inventor and named respondent in the 1972 U.S. Supreme Court patent case Gottschalk v. Benson